XEWGR-AM/XHWGR-FM is an AM-FM combo radio station in Monclova, Coahuila, broadcasting on 780 kHz and 101.1 MHz. It carries the Exa FM CHR format from MVS Radio.

History
XEMF-AM 1260 received its concession on August 19, 1947. It was owned by Humberto Medina Betancourt. In 1994, XHMF-FM was added to convert the station into an AM-FM combo. Just years later, XEMF/XHMF became XEWGR/XHWGR (the XEMF callsign moved to the former XEQX-AM), and soon after this station moved to 780 kHz.

References

External links
Official website

Contemporary hit radio stations in Mexico
Spanish-language radio stations
Radio stations in Coahuila